The 1880 Waitaki by-election was a by-election held  on 16 June 1880 in the  electorate in the Otago and Canterbury regions during the 7th New Zealand Parliament.

The by-election was caused by the resignation of the incumbent Thomas William Hislop, on 28 April 1880.

The by-election was won by George Jones. Jones and William Henry Sherwood Roberts were described as Liberals; John Reid and Duncan Sutherland were described as Conservatives.

Results

References 

 

Waitaki 1880
1880 elections in New Zealand
September 1880 events
Politics of Otago
Politics of Canterbury, New Zealand